Gareth (Old French: Guerehet, Guerrehet) is a Knight of the Round Table in Arthurian legend. He is the youngest son of King Lot and Queen Morgause, King Arthur's half-sister, thus making him Arthur's nephew, as well as brother to Gawain, Agravain and Gaheris, and either a brother or half-brother of Mordred. Gareth is particularly notable in Le Morte d'Arthur, where one of its eight books is named after and largely dedicated to him, and in which he is also known by his nickname Beaumains.

Arthurian legend

French literature 
The earliest role of Gareth, appearing as Guerrehet, is found in the First Continuation of Chrétien de Troyes's Perceval ou le Conte du Graal. As the protagonist of the story's final episode, he slays the giant known as "Little Knight", thus avenging the death of fairy king Brangemuer, son of Guingamuer and the fay Brangepart.

Several of his adventures are narrated in the Vulgate Cycle (Lancelot-Grail). In the Vulgate Merlin, Gareth and his brothers defect from their father King Lot and take service with King Arthur, participating in the early battles against the Saxon invaders of Britain and in the war against King Claudas on the continent. As the youngest and often most chivalrous of the Orkney princes, Gareth later prevents his brothers Gawain and Agravain from killing their other sibling Gaheris in revenge for the murder of their mother the Queen of Orkney, condemns his brothers for their killing of Lamorak, and attempts to dissuade Agravain and Mordred from exposing the secret love affair between Lancelot and Arthur's wife Queen Guinevere. His death at the hands of Bors during Lancelot's rescue of Guinevere from being burned at the stake is related in the Mort Artu (Death of Arthur), the final volume of the Vulgate Cycle. The Vulgate Lancelot and the Vulgate Mort Artu  differ in their characterisation of Gareth: in the Lancelot, he is portrayed as Gawain's most cherished brother; in the Mort Artu, it is rather his older brother, Gaheris.

Le Morte d'Arthur 

Gareth is the subject of Book IV (Caxton VII) in Sir Thomas Malory's Le Morte d'Arthur, "The Tale of Sir Gareth of Orkney", which tells how he became a knight. In Malory's retelling of an episode from the Prose Tristan, Gareth seeks to prove himself worthy of knighthood through his deeds instead of just his lineage. For this reason, he arrives at Camelot in disguise as a kitchen boy as le bel inconnu, or the Fair Unknown, who comes without a name and therefore without a past. He is set to work by Sir Kay, who always gives him difficult work, teases him as a lowly kitchen boy and mockingly nicknames him "Beaumains" or "Good Hands" (alternatively "Beautiful Hands" or "Fair Hands"). Gareth receives much better attention from Sir Lancelot, who gives him gifts of clothes and gold for spending money.

After a year passes, Gareth finally embarks on a knightly quest. He goes to the aid of an unknown woman, later revealed to be the Dame Lynette, to save her sister Lyonesse (both also appearing under various alternate spellings) from the Red Knight of the Red Lands. Gareth is accompanied by the dwarf Melot, who knows his true identity. However, Lynette takes Gareth as a mere kitchen boy and constantly derides him. On the way, he slays the impressive Sir Perarde, the Black Knight, and takes his armour and horse. He then meets Sir Pertolope, the Green Knight, who mistakes him for his brother, the Black Knight. Lynette tells the Green Knight that he is a kitchen boy and begs him to rid her of him. Gareth overcomes the Green Knight, but spares his life in return for the knight's swearing to serve King Arthur. He then in much the same fashion defeats Sir Perymones, the Puce Knight (sometimes the Red Knight, but not to be confused with the one of the Red Lands), and Sir Persaunte (Persant of Inde), the Indigo Knight, both of whom also swear loyalty to Arthur. He arrives at Lyonesse's castle, where she is besieged by Sir Ironside, the Red Knight of the Red Lands. Gareth fights him all day and finally prevails, although the Red Knight has the strength of seven men. Gareth intends to kill him as he himself had slaughtered all the other knights who came to save the lady Lyonesse, but the Red Knight explains that he did so because the lady he loved made him swear to kill Lancelot, and the only way to get his attention was to kill the knights, so Gareth spares the Red Knight, making him swear to serve Arthur and also go to Camelot and apologise to Lancelot. Lustily in love with Lyonesse, Gareth conspires to consummate their relationship before marrying. Only by the magical intervention of Lynette is their tryst unsuccessful, thus preserving Gareth's virginity and, presumably, his standing with God. Gareth later counsels Lyonesse to report to King Arthur and pretend she does not know where he is; instead, he tells her to announce a tournament of his knights against the Round Table. This allows Gareth to disguise himself and win honour by defeating his brother knights. The heralds eventually acknowledge that he is Sir Gareth right as he strikes down Sir Gawain, his brother.

In Malory's telling, there are only two knights that have ever successfully held against Lancelot: Sir Tristan and Gareth. This was always under conditions where one or both parties were unknown by the other, for these knights loved each other "passingly well". Gareth was knighted by Lancelot himself when he took upon him the adventure on behalf of Lynette. Later, Gareth tells Tristan he had parted ways with his brothers Gaheris and Agravain due to their dislike of him and their murderous ways.

In Book VII (Caxton XVIII), "The Death of Arthur", the unarmed Gareth and his brother Gaheris  (who both did not intend to resist) are killed accidentally by the battle-mad Lancelot during the rescue of Guinevere. This leads to the final tragedy of Arthur's Round Table; Gawain refuses to allow King Arthur to accept Lancelot's sincere apology for the deaths of his two brothers. Lancelot genuinely mourns the death of Gareth, whom he loved closely like a son or younger brother. King Arthur is forced by Gawain and Mordred's insistence to go to war against Lancelot. Mordred's grief is largely faked, driven by his desire to become king. This leads to the splitting of the Round Table, Mordred's treachery in trying to seize Guinevere and the throne, Gawain's death from an old unhealed wound, and finally, Arthur and Mordred slaying each other in the final battle.

Modern versions
The legend of Gareth and Lynette has been reinterpreted by many writers and poets, the most renowned being Alfred Lord Tennyson in Idylls of the King (1859–1888). In this version the "colored" knights are replaced by knights associated with various times of day: the final knight is known as Night or Death and is the most feared of the three, though ultimately the weakest; eventually, Gareth marries Lynette. In some other retellings, Gareth marries Lynette's sister, whom he rescues, and Gaheris marries Lynette. Theodore Goodridge Roberts authored the short story "For to Achieve Your Adventure", in which Lynette knows she is sending Gareth into an ambush in an attempt to make him give up for his own protection.

 In the film Knights of the Round Table (1953), he was played by Anthony Forwood.
 Richard Thorp played him in the British film Lancelot and Guinevere (1963).
 Vera Chapman's novel The King's Damosel (1976) gives a complete version of Lynette's life.
 Gareth was portrayed by Jonathan Cake in the film First Knight (1995).
 In the game Mega Man Xtreme 2, Gareth is a knight-like android who serves his master and creator, Berkana.
 In the novel Queen of Camelot (2002) by Nancy McKenzie, Gareth and Lynette formally became betrothed when he first came to Arthur.
 In the Fate franchise, Gareth is depicted as a female knight, while keeping much of the legend's original family traits and story; she ends up brutally killed by the mad Lancelot. An alternative Gareth also appears in a faery world in the "Lostbelt 6: Avalon le Fae" scenario of the mobile game Fate/Grand Order.

Notes

References

External links

 Gareth and Lynette at the Camelot Project

Arthurian characters
Fictional princes
King Arthur's family
Knights of the Round Table